Elections to the United States House of Representatives were held in Pennsylvania on October 14, 1806, for the 10th Congress.

Background
In the previous elections, 17 Democratic-Republicans and 1 Federalist had been elected to represent Pennsylvania.  There were two subsequent special elections which did not result in any seats changing parties.  One seat held by a Democratic-Republican had become vacant and was not yet filled at the time of the election.

As in the previous election, there was a breakaway faction of the Democratic-Republican Party allied with the Federalists known as the tertium quids or Constitutional Republicans, which ran candidates in several districts.  Several of the elected quids aligned with the Federalists on the federal level.

Congressional districts
Pennsylvania was divided into 11 districts, of which four were plural districts with 11 Representatives between them, with the remaining 7 Representatives elected from single-member districts.  The districts were:
The  (3 seats) consisted of Delaware and Philadelphia counties (including the City of Philadelphia)
The  (3 seats) consisted of Bucks, Luzerne, Montgomery, Northampton, and Wayne Counties
The  (3 seats) consisted of Berks, Chester, and Lancaster Counties
The  (2 seats) consisted of Cumberland, Dauphin, Huntingdon, and Mifflin Counties
The  consisted of Centre, Clearfield, Lycoming, McKean, Northumberland, Potter, and Tioga Counties
The  consisted of Adams and York Counties
The  consisted of Bedford and Franklin Counties
The  consisted of Armstrong, Cambria, Indiana, Jefferson, Somerset, and Westmoreland Counties
The  consisted of Fayette and Greene Counties
The  consisted of Washington County
The  consisted of Allegheny, Beaver, Butler, Crawford, Erie, Mercer, Venango, and Warren Counties

Note: Many of these counties covered much larger areas than they do today, having since been divided into smaller counties

Election results
Fifteen incumbents (14 Democratic-Republicans and the sole Federalist) ran for re-election, of whom eleven won re-election. Two seats changed from Democratic-Republican to Federalist control.

Special election
Joseph Clay (DR) of the  resigned March 18, 1808.  A special election was held October 11, 1808, the same day as the 1808 general elections.

References
Electoral data and information on districts are from the Wilkes University Elections Statistics Project

1806
Pennsylvania
United States House of Representatives